Jimmy Auby (born 7 November 1986 in Johannesburg, South Africa) is a South African racing driver. He raced in the South African V8 Championship after progressing from karting. He moved into European competition and featured in the 2007 Euroseries 3000 season and 2008 Spanish Formula Three season.

He was the A1 Team Lebanon driver for 2 rounds of the 2007–08 A1 Grand Prix season and was the backup driver for most of the 2008–09 season.

He gained test driver experience during the 2008 Superleague Formula season. He has also competed in the Spanish Formula 3 and Formula Volkswagen South Africa series, and returned to the WesBank V8 Supercar series in 2010, becoming the series' final champion in 2011.

References

External links
 

1986 births
Living people
Sportspeople from Johannesburg
South African racing drivers
A1 Team Lebanon drivers
Italian Formula Three Championship drivers
Formula Renault Eurocup drivers
Euroformula Open Championship drivers